Ibrahimović is a Bosnian surname derived from the masculine given name Ibrahim (meaning "son of Ibrahim"), the Arabic name of the prophet and patriarch Abraham. Notable people with the name include:
Arijon Ibrahimović (born 2005), German football player of Kosovan descent
 (born 1965), Bosnian director
 (born 1919, died 2003), Bosnian iman and member of 13. SS Handžar division
 (born 1991), Austrian football player of Bosnian descent
Edin Ibrahimovic (born 1998), Austrian volley ball player of Bosnian descent
Ervin Ibrahimović (born 1972), Montenegrin politician, vice president of the Parliament of Montenegro and president of Bosniak Party
Haris Ibrahimovic (born 1998), Finnish football player of Bosniak descent
Miralem Ibrahimović (born 1963), Bosnian former professional footballer
 (born 1958), Bosnian writer, literary and film critic, screenwriter and documentarian
Nermin Ibrahimović (born 1990), Serbian professional footballer
Sanel Ibrahimović (born 1987), Bosnian professional footballer
Tijana Ibrahimovic, American entertainment journalist of Serbian descent
Zlatan Ibrahimović (born 1981), Swedish professional footballer of Bosniak descent

Bosnian surnames
Patronymic surnames
Surnames from given names